The Girl Who Runs the Beat Hotel is the second album by English indie pop band Biff Bang Pow!, released in 1987.

Track listing
Side A
"Someone Stole My Wheels" - (02:45)
"Love's Gone Out of Fashion" - (03:16)
"She Never Understood" - (03:13)
"He Don't Need That Girl" - (02:06)
"She Shivers Inside" - (03:21
Side B
"The Beat Hotel" - (02:17)
"The Happiest Girl in the World" - (03:23)
"If I Die" - (02:35)
"Five Minutes in the Life of Greenwood Goulding" - (04:23)
"The Whole World Is Turning Brouchard!" - (01:29)

References

1987 albums
Biff Bang Pow! albums